The first generation of the BMW 4 Series consists of the BMW F32 (coupé version), BMW F33 (convertible version) and BMW F36 (five-door liftback version, marketed as 'Gran Coupé') compact executive cars. The F32/F33/F36 was produced from 2014 to 2020 and is often collectively referred to as the F32.

The F32 was introduced as the successor to the E92/E93 coupé/convertible models of the fifth-generation 3 Series range. The F32 is produced alongside - and shares many features with - the F30 3 Series. As with the F30 3 Series range, the F32/F33/F36 is powered by turbocharged petrol and diesel engines with three cylinders (petrol only), four cylinders, and six cylinders.

The high performance F82/F83 M4 models were introduced in early 2014. They are powered by the S55 turbocharged straight-six engine.

Development and launch 
Official details of the "Concept 4 Series" were released in December 2012, detailing the intention to replace the E92 3 Series coupé with a new 4 Series line. In 2013, the concept vehicle (called the Concept 4 Series Coupé) was unveiled at the North American International Auto Show. The concept car was designed by Won Kyu Kang.

Body styles

Coupé (F32)
The coupé models were unveiled in September 2013 at the Frankfurt Motor Show. Nicolas Huet was the lead designer of the F32 coupe.

The launch models consisted of the petrol 428i and 435i, and the diesel 420d. In the remainder of 2013, the following models were added: 420i, 420d, 425d, 430d and 435d. In 2014, the 418d model was added. Most models were available with all-wheel drive ("xDrive").

Convertible (F33) 

The convertible body style was unveiled at the 2013 Tokyo Motor Show, followed by the 2013 LA Auto Show.

Its international launch was in Las Vegas in January 2014. The launch models were the petrol-engined 428i and 435i, and the diesel 420d. All-wheel drive (xDrive) became available a few months after the launch.

Like its predecessor, the F33 has a three-part retractable hardtop. It includes noise-absorbing headliner and air curtains. A wind deflector and neck warmers were available as options.

Gran Coupé (F36)

The 4 Series Gran Coupé was unveiled at the 2014 Geneva Motor Show, followed by 2014 New York International Auto Show and the 13th Beijing International Automotive Exhibition in 2014. Production of the Gran Coupé began in the Dingolfing plant in July 2014.

As per the larger 6 Series Gran Coupé (F06), the F36 has coupé styling with a fastback rear. However, the F36 also includes a C-pillar located behind the rear doors. Compared with the F30 sedan, the F36 has  less rear headroom and the same cargo volume.

The launch models were the petrol-engined 420i, 428i and 435i, and the diesel 418d and 420d. The 435i Gran Coupé is approximately  heavier than the equivalent F30 335i sedan.

Equipment 

Available equipment includes a head-up display, 8-speed automatic transmission and LED headlights.

Optional "BMW M Performance Parts" were unveiled at the 2013 Frankfurt Motor Show. The available upgrades included exhausts, power upgrades, bodykit, limited slip differential, steering wheels and interior trims.

Engines

Petrol

Diesel

M4 version 

Up until 2014, BMW M models used the same model codes as the rest of the model range. However, the F32/F33/F36 generation was one of the first where the M models use separate model codes: F82 for the coupé and F83 for the convertible.

The gearbox is either a 6-speed manual (with throttle blip on downshifts) or a 7-speed dual clutch transmission (M-DCT).

The M4 also features an electronically controlled limited-slip differential, electric steering, additional bolted joints between the axle subframe and the body sills, aluminium stiffening plate and a five-link rear suspension constructed from aluminium.  Carbon-fibre is used for the roof, bootlid, strut brace and driveshaft. Unusually, the suspension subframes are directly connected to the chassis without rubber bushings. An optional head-up display comes with additional M-specific functions such as a gear display, rev counter and Optimum Shift Indicator.

The concept version of the M4 Coupé was unveiled at the Pebble Beach Concours d'Elegance on 15 August 2013, followed production version being unveiled at the 2014 North American International Auto Show on 13 January 2014.

The production version of the M4 convertible was also unveiled at the 2014 New York International Auto Show.

Alpina version 
The Alpina B4 (petrol) and Alpina D4 (diesel) models were based on the F32.

Model year changes

2016 
 Limited Edition 435i ZHP Coupé model released in the USA.
 Engines upgraded, along with F30 3 Series LCI models.
 440i model replaces the 435i, and 430i model replaces the 428i.
 425d model introduced

2017 facelift 
The facelift (LCI) changes were unveiled on 16 January 2017, with the first pictures of the refreshed Coupé (F32 LCI) shown in the new color Snapper Rocks Blue (turquoise blue), and the Convertible (F33 LCI) shown in the also new, Sunset Orange colour  (bright orange). The Gran Coupé (F36 LCI) model was shown in a silver colour. Major changes include:

 Exterior design changes including redesigned LED headlights, tail-lights, and bumpers
 Interior design changes including an updated iDrive system (version 6.0)
 Revised stiffer suspension on Coupé and Gran Coupé models
 New additional trim, wheel, and exterior colour options

Motorsport

M4 DTM Touring Car 

The M4 DTM was developed in 2013 to replace the E92 M3 DTM, has been raced in DTM from 2014 to the present. It was designed by BMW chief engineer Dominic Harlow and unveiled in official ITR tests in Budapest. The M4 DTM replaced the retired BMW M3 DTM at the end of the 2013 season.

In its debut 2014 season, Marco Wittmann won the Drivers' Championship in the M4 and Team RMG won the Teams' Championship. In the 2016 season, Marco Wittman again won the Drivers' Championship in the M4.

M4 DTM Safety Car 
The M4 were used as a safety car at DTM races from 2014–present. The M4 DTM Safety Car features Recaro racing seats, a roll bar, bonnet with "motorsport lock", LED lights on the roof and LED lights on the front apron.

M4 MotoGP Safety Car 
The M4 was used as a safety car at MotoGP races from 2014–present. The car was unveiled at the 2014 Qatar motorcycle Grand Prix. It features Recaro racing seats, a roll bar, bonnet with motorsport lock, LED lights at roof and front apron, main electricity switch at bonnet, removal of the rear seat, fuel pump system, a fire extinguisher and a race display on the steering wheel.

Production volumes 
The F32 coupé and F82 M4 coupé are produced in Munich, with production beginning in July 2013. The F33 convertible is produced in Regensburg, beginning in November 2013. The F36 Gran Coupé is produced in Dingolfing.

The following are production figures for the 4 Series range:

See also 

 Alpina B4
 BMW 3 Series (F30)
 BMW 4 Series

References 

4 Series (G22)
Cars introduced in 2013
2020s cars